Dardo Fernando Caballero Ferrari (born March 9, 1981) is an Uruguayan footballer who plays as a central defender.

Football career
In his country, Caballero played for Huracán Buceo, C.A. Rentistas and Club Atlético River Plate. In 2008, he moved abroad, joining Norwegian side IL Hødd, for which he appeared 13 times, scoring once. At the end of 2008, the team was relegated.

In August 2009, after one year out of football, Caballero signed with Córdoba CF of the Spanish second division, one day before the summer transfer window closed.

References

External links
 TenfieldDigital profile 
 Futbolme profile  
 International Soccer Consultants profile

1981 births
Living people
Footballers from Montevideo
Uruguayan footballers
Association football defenders
Club Atlético River Plate (Montevideo) players
IL Hødd players
Norwegian First Division players
Córdoba CF players
Uruguayan expatriate footballers
Expatriate footballers in Norway
Expatriate footballers in Spain
Uruguayan expatriate sportspeople in Norway